The HTC Tattoo (formerly known as the HTC Click) is a phone manufactured by the HTC Corporation for the Android platform. It is the second phone to feature the HTC Sense interface. The phone was announced on 8 September 2009.

Unlike other Android handsets from HTC, the Tattoo has a resistive touchscreen instead of a capacitive touchscreen. The device's designer explained that it was tested with a capacitive display, but that multi-touch simply wasn't practical on such a small screen, while the company's Twitter feed states that a capacitive screen is insufficiently accurate at this size. The resistive screen may also reduce costs. It has been confirmed by HTC that the company’s future Android handsets will use capacitive screens, making the Tattoo the only one to use resistive.

Specifications 

The specifications on 9 September 2009: 
Screen size: 
Screen resolution: 240 x 320
Input devices: resistive touchscreen
3.2-megapixel fixed-focus rear-facing camera
GPS (GPS)
Digital compass
RAM: 256 MB
ROM: 512 MB
microSD slot (SDHC compatible)
Operating system: Android 1.6 and HTC Sense
Wi-Fi (802.11b/g)
Bluetooth 2.0 + EDR & A2DP
HTC ExtUSB (Mini-B USB backward compatible)
3.5 mm audio jack, microphone, speaker
Accelerometer
FM radio with RDS

Customisable covers

The HTC Tattoo was the first smartphone from the company with fully customisable covers hence the name Tattoo.  The phone's plastic shell can be removed and replaced with one of a design of the owner's choice. The now no longer available TattooMyHTC website was launched on 12 October 2009, offering pre-made designs for €11.99 or personalised designs for €14.99.

See also 
 Comparison of smartphones
 HTC Dream
 HTC Magic
 HTC Hero
 Galaxy Nexus

References

HTC Android Series Mobiles released in 2009

External links
 
 HTC Tattoo at PDAdb.net
 Tattoo My HTC

Android (operating system) devices
HTC smartphones
Mobile phones introduced in 2009
Discontinued smartphones